As of September 2016, the International Union for Conservation of Nature (IUCN) lists 1674 data deficient plant species. 7.6% of all evaluated plant species are listed as data deficient. 
The IUCN also lists 18 subspecies and 57 varieties as data deficient. No subpopulations of plants have been evaluated by the IUCN.

This is a complete list of data deficient plant species, subspecies and varieties evaluated by the IUCN.

Algae
There are 49 alga species evaluated as data deficient.

Green algae
Ectochaete perforans
Rhizoclonium robustum

Red algae

Charophyta

Bryophytes
There are seven bryophyte species evaluated as data deficient.

Mosses

Liverworts

Pteridophytes
There are 58 pteridophyte species evaluated as data deficient.

Leptosporangiate ferns
There are 50 species in the class Polypodiopsida evaluated as data deficient.

Polypodiales
There are 42 species in the order Polypodiales evaluated as data deficient.

Dryopteridaceae

Polypodiaceae

Blechnaceae

Tectariaceae

Other Polypodiales species

Hymenophyllales

Cyatheales
Cyathea cystolepis

Isoetopsida

Gymnosperms
There are 20 species and 16 varieties of gymnosperm evaluated as data deficient.

Cycads

Conifers

Species

Varieties

Gnetopsida

Dicotyledons
There are 1087 species, 17 subspecies, and 36 varieties of dicotyledon evaluated as data deficient.

Piperales

Species

Varieties
Piper lucigaudens var. alleni

Campanulales

Theales

Species

Varieties
Symphonia globulifera var. angustifolia

Malvales

Species

Varieties
Elaeocarpus calomala var. villosiusculus

Polygalales

Rubiales

Species

Varieties

Violales

Euphorbiales

Euphorbiaceae

Species

Subspecies
Phyllanthus nutans subsp. grisebachianus
Varieties

Laurales

Ebenales

Myrtales

Species

Varieties
Terminalia glabrata var. haroldii

Sapindales
There are 33 species, one subspecies, and one variety in the order Sapindales evaluated as data deficient.

Rutaceae

Species

Varieties
Phellodendron amurense var. wilsonii

Sapindaceae

Anacardiaceae

Meliaceae

Other Sapindales

Species

Subspecies
Acer caesium subsp. caesium, Indian maple

Asterales

Species

Subspecies
Darwiniothamnus lancifolius subsp. lancifolius

Magnoliales
There are 112 species, one subspecies, and one variety in the order Magnoliales evaluated as data deficient.

Magnoliaceae

Annonaceae

Species

Varieties
Monodora junodii var. macrantha

Myristicaceae

Species

Subspecies
Myristica lepidota subsp. lepidota

Capparales
There are 41 species in Capparales evaluated as data deficient.

Capparaceae

Cruciferae

Apiales

Gentianales

Species

Varieties

Rosales
There are 37 species in the order Rosales evaluated as data deficient.

Rosaceae

Other Rosales species

Primulales
There are 21 species in Primulales evaluated as data deficient.

Myrsinaceae

Primulaceae
Androsace mathildae

Solanales

Species

Varieties
Cuscuta kilimanjari var. rukararana

Scrophulariales
There are 70 species in the order Scrophulariales evaluated as data deficient.

Oleaceae

Gesneriaceae

Myoporaceae
Myoporum rimatarense

Acanthaceae

Scrophulariaceae

Lentibulariaceae
Genlisea glandulosissima
Utricularia bremii

Lamiales

Species

Varieties

Nepenthales

Ranunculales

Podostemales

Fabales

Species

Subspecies
Sesbania coccinea subsp. atollensis
Varieties
Butea monosperma var. lutea
Lonchocarpus guatemalensis var. proteranthus

Caryophyllales
There are 146 species and one subspecies in the order Caryophyllales evaluated as data deficient.

Caryophyllaceae

Species

Subspecies
Spergularia media subsp. intermedia

Cactus species

Other Caryophyllales species

Fagales
There are 52 species, eight subspecies, and nine varieties in the order Fagales evaluated as data deficient.

Fagaceae

Betulaceae

Species

Subspecies

Varieties

Callitrichales

Other dicotyledons

Species

Subspecies

Monocotyledons
There are 453 species, one subspecies, and five varieties of monocotyledon evaluated as data deficient.

Arecales

Orchidales
There are 57 species and one variety in Orchidales evaluated as data deficient.

Orchidaceae

Burmanniaceae

Varieties
Afrothismia winkleri var. budongensis

Cyclanthales
Dicranopygium goudotii

Pandanales

Species
Pandanus parvicentralis
Pandanus teuszii
Varieties
Pandanus tectorius var. uapensis

Bromeliales

Liliales
There are 97 species in the order Liliales evaluated as data deficient.

Iridaceae

Aloaceae

Liliaceae

Alliaceae

Other Liliales species

Arales
There are 88 species in Arales evaluated as data deficient.

Araceae

Lemnaceae
Wolffiella repanda

Zingiberales
There are 17 species and two varieties in the order Zingiberales evaluated as data deficient.

Heliconiaceae
Heliconia flabellata
Heliconia willisiana

Zingiberaceae

Species

Varieties
Amomum tomrey var. stenophyllum
Amomum villosum var. xanthioides

Eriocaulales

Commelinales

Cyperales
There are 70 species, one subspecies, and one variety in Cyperales evaluated as data deficient.

Gramineae

Cyperaceae

Species

Subspecies
Pycreus flavescens subsp. tanaensis
Varieties
Carex cognata var. congolensis

Alismatales

Najadales

Juncales

Hydrocharitales

See also 
 Lists of IUCN Red List data deficient species
 List of least concern plants
 List of near threatened plants
 List of vulnerable plants
 List of endangered plants
 List of critically endangered plants
 List of recently extinct plants

Notes

References 

Plants
Data deficient plants